Le Champ-Saint-Père is a commune in the Vendée department in the Pays de la Loire region in western France.

Geography
The river Yon forms all of the commune's north-eastern border, then flows into the Lay, which forms all of its eastern border.

See also
Communes of the Vendée department

References

Communes of Vendée